Denny Lawrence (born 1951 in Sydney) is an Australian actor, writer, producer and director of television, theatre and film.

He studied at NIDA and the Australian Film, Television and Radio School. Among his most notable credits are the feature film Goodbye Paradise (1983) and the mini-series Bodyline (1984). He has also worked extensively as a teacher.

Select credits

Films
The Outing – short
Goodbye Paradise (1983) – co-writer
Emoh Ruo (1985) – director
The Coca-Cola Kid (1985) – additional dialogue
Archer (1986) – director
Army Wives (1986) – director
Warm Nights on a Slow Moving Train (1987) – co-writer
Afraid to Dance (1988) – director
Rainbow's End (1995) – director
A Divided Heart (2008) – director

TV series
The Young Doctors (1979–80) – director
The Restless Years – director
Sons and Daughters (1982–83) – director
Bodyline (1984) – co-writer, co-director
Palace of Dreams (1985) – co-writer, co-director
The Last Resort (1988) – director
The Bill (1991) – director
A Country Practice (1980s) – producer, director
Snowy River: The McGregor Saga (1995–96) – producer, director, writer
State Coroner (1998) – director
Something in the Air (2000-2001) – director
Blue Heelers (2002) – director
MDA (2002-2003) – producer, director
Tricky Business (2012) – producer

References

External links

Theatre credits at AusStage

Australian film directors
Australian television directors
Australian theatre directors
Male actors from Sydney
1951 births
Living people